Lev Stefanovich Danilov (April 19, 1926 —  September 22, 1991) was a Russian film director and screenwriter. Laureate of the Lenin Prize (1980).

Life and career 
He was born on April 19, 1926 in Vladivostok in the family of an employee. Member of the Great Patriotic War. He was awarded the medal "For Courage" (1945), the Order of the Patriotic War, I degree (1985).

Graduated from the directing department of the All-Union State Institute of Cinematography (1951; workshop of Igor Savchenko).

He worked at the Far Eastern Television Studio, in 1956-1957    at the Odessa Film studio, where he directed the film ""  (1957; co-authored with Grigori Aronov).

Since 1958 he has been working at the Central Studio for Documentary Film in Moscow. Lev Stefanovich Danilov died on September 22, 1991.

Selected filmography
 The Sailor Went Ashore (1957)
 Cuban Encounters (1961)
 Near Eternity (1968)
 Liberation of Ukraine (1978)
 Commanders. Memories of the Last War (1988)
 Penal Battalion (Plots from order No. 227) (1989)
 On the Katyn Question (1989)
 Dossier on General Vlasov (1990)

References

External links

 Lev Danilov at KinoPoisk

1926 births
1991 deaths
Recipients of the Medal "For Courage" (Russia)
Mass media people from Vladivostok
Soviet film directors
Soviet documentary film directors
Soviet screenwriters
Soviet military personnel of World War II
Gerasimov Institute of Cinematography alumni
Lenin Prize winners